Geographies of Solitude is a Canadian documentary film by Jacquelyn Mills and released in 2022. The film is guided by Zoe Lucas, a naturalist and environmentalist who lives on Nova Scotia's Sable Island, where she catalogues the island's wild Sable Island horses, and endeavours to protect the unique ecosystem.

The film was shot on 16mm film.

Geographies of Solitude premiered in February 2022 at the 72nd Berlin International Film Festival, where it won the Prize of the Ecumenical Jury, the CICAE Arthouse Cinema Award and the Caligari Film Prize. It had its Canadian premiere at the 2022 Hot Docs Canadian International Documentary Festival, where it won the award for Best Canadian Feature Documentary as well as The Earl A. Glick Emerging Canadian Filmmaker Award.

It was also screened at the 2022 Jeonju International Film Festival, where it was the winner of the International Competition Grand Prize. Recently the film was named Canada's Best Documentary at Gimli International Film Festival and received Best Cinematography at Cervino CineMountain International Film Festival in Italy.

The film was longlisted for the Directors Guild of Canada's 2022 Jean-Marc Vallée DGC Discovery Award. For her work on the film, Mills was awarded the Earl A. Glick emerging Canadian filmmaker award. It won the award for Best Canadian Documentary Film at the 2022 Vancouver International Film Festival. Mills received a Canadian Screen Award nomination for Best Cinematography in a Documentary at the 11th Canadian Screen Awards in 2023.

The film has won 19 awards nationally and internationally as well as being nominated for an IDA.

References

External links
 
 Geographies of Solitude Film Official Website

2022 films
2022 documentary films
Canadian documentary films
Documentary films about women
Films shot in Nova Scotia
Sable Island
2020s English-language films
2020s Canadian films